Venezuela is a country in South America.

Venezuela may also refer to:

Places

States
 First Republic of Venezuela, the first independent government of Venezuela
 Second Republic of Venezuela, republic founded by Simón Bolívar in 1813
 Third Republic of Venezuela, 1817–1819, superseded by Gran Colombia
 Gran Colombia, 1819 union of Venezuela and other South American states
 Republic of Venezuela, 1953-1999
 Bolivarian Republic of Venezuela, from 1999

Localities
 Venezuela (Buenos Aires Metro), a metro station in Buenos Aires, Argentina
 Venezuela (Pueblo), Río Piedras, Puerto Rico
 Venezuela, Cuba, municipality in Ciego de Ávila Province

Music
 Venezuela (album), a 1958 album by Aldemaro Romero

See also 
 Venezuelan (disambiguation)
 Valenzuela (disambiguation)